Pir Budhan Shah (died 1643), also called Baba Budhan Ali Shah, Peer Baba, and Sayyed Shamsuddin, was a venerated Sufi pir who held a religious discourse with Guru Nanak in Rawalpindi and later accepted Gurmat thought during the times of Guru Hargobind. He was a Sufi Muslim by birth and when he met Guru Nanak, founder of Sikhism, he converted to Sikhism. He was born in Talwandi, the same village as Guru Nanak. He is venerated by Sikhs, Muslims, and Hindus. It is believed that he lived for around 500 years.

Renunciation

Buddan Shah, a  Muhammedan, belonged to a family of chieftains, but left everything to become a Sufi mystic. He lived near Rawalpindi. Guru Nanak met him during his travels. He is believed to have arrived in Jammu sometime during the 15th century.

He was very close to Bidhi Chand Chhina, as were his followers. His disciple, Sunder Shah, died together with Bidhi Chand at Devnagar near Ayodhya on the banks of the Gomti River in 1638.

Death

Budhan Shah lived up to the time of Guru Hargobind and died in 1643. His mausoleum is located on hilltop in Kiratpur, about 200 meters east of the ashram of Baba Gurditta. His tomb is visited by both the Sikhs and Muslims of the region. A dargah shrine dedicated to him is located in Jammu City, across the Tawi River from the local Jammu Airport.

Notes

References

History of Sikhism
Converts to Sikhism